Marie (died 1759) was an enslaved Cree person who was sentenced to death in Trois-Rivières, New France.

Little is known of her before August 1759. Marie was enslaved by military officer Joseph Boucher de Niverville and forced to serve his family in Trois-Rivières.

On 20 August 1759 there was a dispute between Marie and Boucher de Niverville's wife, Marie-Josephte Chastelain, and his mother, Marguerite. Marie apparently took a kitchen knife she had been sharpening and struck the two women with it, slightly wounding both of them. Marie fled to the attic where she attempted to hang herself, but she was discovered by Nicolas-Joseph de Noyelles. Marie recovered, despite a treatment of bloodletting by a surgeon.

Marie was charged with violence against the two women and with attempting suicide, a capital offense. As Marie apparently spoke little or no French, she was provided with two interpreters, Joseph Chevalier (an armourer) and another named only as Saint-Jean. It's likely that both spoke Ottawa dialect rather than Marie's Cree language.

The sentence was appealed by crown attorney Joseph-Marie Godefroy de Tonnancour who considered it too lenient. The colony's  in Montréal agreed, and, on 29 December 1759 they ordered "the said Marie, Indian, to be hanged and strangled until death do ensue on a gallows erected for that purpose in the marketplace of this town...[and] her dead body be exposed for two hours."

References

Date of birth unknown
18th-century births
1759 deaths
Canadian slaves
18th-century slaves
18th-century Canadian women
Cree people
First Nations women
Pre-Confederation Quebec people
People of New France
People executed by France by hanging
People executed by the Ancien Régime in France
Executed women
18th-century executions by France